Frank Gould may refer to:
Frank M. Gould, head college football coach for the Wabash College Little Giants
Frank Jay Gould (1877–1956), son of financier Jay Gould
Frank H. Gould, member of the California State Assembly